Lee Tandoh Ocran (born about 1945; died 21 February 2019) was a Ghanaian politician who served as Minister for Education of Ghana from 2012 to 2013. Ocran was appointed Minister by President John Atta Mills in February 2012 in a cabinet reshuffle following the resignation of Betty Mould-Iddrisu from the government and the sacking of Martin Amidu.

Career 
In 2000 he was Deputy Minister of Environment Science and Technology. He was the former Minister for Education from 2012 to 2013. He was sworn in as a board chairman of VRA in February 2014. He was also the former High Commissioner of Ghana to South Africa.

Early life 
Since January 2005 as candidate from the National Democratic Congress he was Member of Parliament for the Jomoro constituency until he lost his seat to the daughter of Kwame Nkrumah, Samia Nkrumah of the Convention People's Party in the December 2008 parliamentary election. In February 2014 Ocran was sworn in as board chairman of Volta River Authority. On  he described the Bui Dam as a White Elephant (extravagant but burdensome gift).

Personal life 
He was a Christian and worshiped as a Catholic. He was married with three children.

Death 
He died at the age of 74 after battling with illnesses.

See also 
List of Mills government ministers
Jomoro constituency

References

External links and sources 
Profile on Ghana government website

Ghanaian MPs 2005–2009
Education ministers of Ghana
National Democratic Congress (Ghana) politicians
High Commissioners of Ghana to South Africa
1940s births
Year of birth uncertain
2019 deaths
Ghana National College alumni